Ben Jago (born 4 September 1996) is an English footballer who plays for Llandudno.

Career
Jago was first included in a Tranmere matchday squad on 10 January 2015, remaining an unused substitute for their goalless League Two draw away to Morecambe at the Globe Arena. After two further games remaining on the bench, he made his professional debut at Prenton Park on 21 March, replacing Marc Laird for the final 13 minutes of a 1–4 home defeat against Burton Albion. His second game was against Bury on 2 May, Tranmere's final match of a 94-year tenure in The Football League. He came on in the final minute for Iain Hume in the 0–1 home defeat.

On 19 June Jago along with three other youth system products signed his first professional one-year contract.

On 3 August Jago joined Northern Premier League side Hyde United on loan until 31 December.

On 30 January 2016, Jago scored on his debut for Annan Athletic in Scottish League Two, replacing Ryan McStay in the 65th minute and heading the final goal of a 4–2 win over Elgin City at the Galabank. On his first start two weeks later, he received a straight red card at the end of a 3–3 draw against Montrose for fouling Ross Campbell. Jago was released by Tranmere Rovers on 3 May 2016. He scored on trial for Southport in a friendly draw against Bury in July.

In August 2016, Jago joined Welsh Premier League side Llandudno. After not getting a first-team place, he left for Skelmersdale United of the Northern Premier League before returning in December.

Statistics

References

External links

1996 births
Living people
Annan Athletic F.C. players
Association football midfielders
Cymru Premier players
English Football League players
English footballers
Footballers from Widnes
Hyde United F.C. players
Llandudno F.C. players
Northern Premier League players
Scottish Professional Football League players
Skelmersdale United F.C. players
Tranmere Rovers F.C. players